Caul fat, also known as lace fat, omentum,  or fat netting, is the thin membrane which surrounds the internal organs of some animals, such as cows, sheep, and pigs, also known as the greater omentum. It is used as a casing for sausages, roulades, pâtés, and various other meat dishes. The Navajo people of the Southwestern United States wrap sheep intestines around strips of caul fat to make a dish called .

References

Further reading

Offal
Animal fats